The 1910 New York state election was held on November 8, 1910, to elect the governor, the lieutenant governor, the Secretary of State, the state comptroller, the attorney general, the state treasurer, the state engineer and two judges of the New York Court of Appeals, as well as all members of the New York State Assembly and the New York State Senate. The voters were also asked if they approved a $2,500,000 bond issue for the improvement and extension of Palisades Interstate Park, which was answered in the affirmative, with 349,281 For and 285,910 Against. A constitutional amendment which proposed to add two judges to the New York Court of Appeals and to increase the judges' salaries was rejected by a margin of only 292 votes, with 332,300 For and 332,592 Against.

History
The Socialist state convention met on June 26 at Schenectady, New York. They nominated Charles Edward Russell for governor; Gustave Adolph Strebel for lieutenant governor; Mrs. Bertha Mathews Fraser, of Brooklyn, for secretary of state; Orcus A. Curtis for comptroller; Sylvester Butler, of Schenectady, for treasurer; Henry L. Slobodin for attorney general; William Lippelt, of Rochester, for state engineer; and Morris Hillquit and Louis B. Boudin for the Court of Appeals. Bertha M. Fraser was the first woman in New York history to be nominated for state office.

The Republican state convention met on September 27 and 28 at Saratoga Springs, New York. Ex-President Theodore Roosevelt was elected temporary chairman. Roosevelt steamrollered the old political bosses, and made the convention nominate his choices. Henry L. Stimson was nominated on the first ballot after a nominating speech by Roosevelt (vote: Stimson 684, William S. Bennet 242, Thomas B. Dunn 38, James B. McEwan 35).

The Democratic state convention met on September 29 and 30 at Rochester, New York. Herbert P. Bissell, of Buffalo, was permanent chairman. John Alden Dix was nominated for governor on the first ballot (vote: Dix 434, William Sulzer 16).

The Independence League state convention met on October 5 at Cooper Union in New York City. Alfred J. Boulton, the People's Party candidate for governor in 1904, was temporary chairman until the choice of Herbert R. Limberg, of New York City, as permanent chairman. Hearst (at the time on board the Mauretania returning from Europe, and in contact by wireless messages) wanted the League to endorse the Republican ticket, but the delegates chose to nominate a separate ticket (vote: 212 for, 94 against, 93 did not vote). They nominated the chairman of the League's State Committee John J. Hopper for governor, and Hearst for lieutenant governor, and then adjourned. The convention met again on October 7, and nominated Dr. Thomas P. Scully, of Oneida County, for secretary of state; Arnold B. MacStay, of New York City, for comptroller; William I. Sirovich for treasurer; James E. Lee, of Rockland County, for state engineer; Robert Stewart, of Brooklyn, for attorney general; and Reuben Robie Lyon and James A. Allen, of New York City, for the Court of Appeals.

Result
The whole Democratic ticket was elected.

The incumbent Vann was re-elected. The incumbents Koenig, O'Malley and Williams were defeated.

The Republican, Democratic, Independence League, Socialist and Prohibition parties maintained automatic ballot status (necessary 10,000 votes), the Socialist Labor Party did not re-attain it.

Obs.: 
"Blank, void and scattering" votes: 8,239 (Governor); 10,007 (Lt. Gov.); 10,695 (Secretary); 10,811 (Comptroller); 11,066 (Treasurer); 11,129 (Engineer); 11,295 (Att. Gen.); 429,307 (amendment); 448,869 (bond issue)
In the Appeals Court election, Collin received 1,131,944 votes on the Democratic line and 166,915 as an Independent. Vann received 1,156,079 votes on the Republican line and 145,890 votes as an Independent.

See also
 New York gubernatorial elections

Notes

Sources
The tickets in Auburn (Soc., Proh., Soc. L.) in The Auburn Citizen on October 29, 1910
The Rep. nominees: STIMSON FIGHTER OF BIG GRAFT CASES in NYT on September 29, 1910
The Dem. nominees: DIX HAS RISEN FAST IN STATE POLITICS in NYT on October 1, 1910
Result: FINAL FIGURES OUT ON STATE ELECTION in NYT on December 16, 1910 [omits judges]
Result in New York City: Revised City Vote on State Ticket in NYT on November 10, 1910
New York State Red Book 1911
Result: The Tribune Almanac 1911

1910
1910 New York (state) elections